Anne Knight (1786–1862) was a feminist.

Anne Knight may also refer to:
Anne Knight (children's writer) (1792–1860), Quaker children's writer and educationalist
Rhondi A. Vilott Salsitz (born 1949), American writer who uses Anne Knight as a pseudonym

See also
Knight (surname)